In computer science, full virtualization (fv) employs techniques used to create instances of an environment, as opposed to simulation, which models the environment; or emulation, which replicates the target environment such as certain kinds of virtual machine environments. Full virtualization requires that every salient feature of the hardware be reflected into one of several virtual machines – including the full instruction set, input/output operations, interrupts, memory access, and whatever other elements are used by the software that runs on the bare machine, and that is intended to run in a virtual machine. In such an environment, any software capable of execution on the raw hardware can be run in the virtual machine and, in particular, any operating systems. The obvious test of full virtualization is whether an operating system intended for stand-alone use can successfully run inside a virtual machine. This is a modern technique developed in late 1990s and is different from simulation and emulation.

The cornerstone of full virtualization or type-1 virtualization is a hypervisor or Super Operating system that operates at a higher privilege level than the OS. This Hypervisor or Super OS requires two key features to provision and protect virtualized environments. These two features are: 
 OS-Independent Storage Management to provision resources for all supported Virtual Environments such as Linux, Microsoft Windows or embedded environments and to protect those environments from unauthorized access and, 
 Switching of Virtualized environments to allocate physical computing resources to Virtual Environments.

See Intel VT-x or AMD-V for a detailed description of privilege levels for Hypervisor, OS and User modes, VMCS, VM-Exit and VM-Entry. This virtualization is not to be confused with IBM Virtual Machine implementations of late 60's and early 70's as IBM systems architecture supported only two modes of Supervisor and Program which provided no security or separation of Virtual Machines. 

Other forms of platform virtualization allow only certain or modified software to run within a virtual machine. The concept of full virtualization is well established in the literature, but it is not always referred to by this specific term; see platform virtualization for terminology.

An important example of Virtual Machines, not to be confused with Virtualization implemented by emulation was that provided by the control program of IBM's CP/CMS operating system.  It was first demonstrated with IBM's CP-40 research system in 1967, then distributed via open source in CP/CMS in 1967–1972, and re-implemented in IBM's VM family from 1972 to the present. Each CP/CMS user was provided a simulated, stand-alone computer. Each such virtual machine had the complete capabilities of the underlying machine, and (for its user) the virtual machine was indistinguishable from a private system. This simulation was comprehensive, and was based on the Principles of Operation manual for the hardware. It thus included such elements as an instruction set, main memory, interrupts, exceptions, and device access. The result was a single machine that could be multiplexed among many users.

Full virtualization is possible only with the right combination of hardware and software elements. For example, it was not possible with most of IBM's System/360 series with the exception being the IBM System/360-67; nor was it possible with IBM's early System/370 system. IBM added virtual memory hardware to the System/370 series in 1972 which is not the same as Intel VT-x Rings providing a higher privilege level for Hypervisor to properly control Virtual Machines requiring full access to Supervisor and Program or User modes.

Similarly, full virtualization was not quite possible with the x86 platform until the 2005–2006 addition of the AMD-V and Intel VT-x extensions (see x86 virtualization). Many platform hypervisors for the x86 platform came very close and claimed full virtualization even prior to the AMD-V and Intel VT-x additions. Examples include Adeos, Mac-on-Linux, Parallels Desktop for Mac, Parallels Workstation, VMware Workstation, VMware Server (formerly GSX Server), VirtualBox, Win4BSD, and Win4Lin Pro.  VMware, for instance, employs a technique called binary translation to automatically modify x86 software on-the-fly to replace instructions that "pierce the virtual machine" with a different, virtual machine safe sequence of instructions; this technique provides the appearance of full virtualization.

A key challenge for full virtualization is the interception and simulation of privileged operations, such as I/O instructions. The effects of every operation performed within a given virtual machine must be kept within that virtual machine – virtual operations cannot be allowed to alter the state of any other virtual machine, the control program, or the hardware. Some machine instructions can be executed directly by the hardware, since their effects are entirely contained within the elements managed by the control program, such as memory locations and arithmetic registers. But other instructions that would "pierce the virtual machine" cannot be allowed to execute directly; they must instead be trapped and simulated. Such instructions either access or affect state information that is outside the virtual machine.

Full virtualization has proven highly successful for:
 sharing a computer system among multiple users;
 isolating users from each other (and from the control program);
 emulating new hardware to achieve improved reliability, security, and productivity.

See also
 Comparison of platform virtualization software
 CP/CMS
 Hardware-assisted virtualization
 Hyperjacking
 Hypervisor
 I/O virtualization
 LPAR
 OS-level virtualization
 Paravirtualization
 Hardware virtualization
 Popek and Goldberg virtualization requirements
 PR/SM
 Virtual machine

References

See specific sources listed under platform virtualization and (for historical sources) CP/CMS.

External links
 Compatibility is Not Transparency: VMM Detection Myths and Realities 

Hardware virtualization